The chairman of the Central Military Commission is the head of the Central Military Commission (CMC) and the commander-in-chief of the People's Liberation Army (PLA). There are technically two offices with the same name; the chairman of the Chinese Communist Party (CCP) CMC and chairman of the People's Republic of China (PRC) CMC. However, they de facto function as one office. The officeholder is usually the CCP general secretary.

According to Chapter 3, Section 4 of the Constitution of the PRC, "The Central Military Commission of the People's Republic of China directs the armed forces of the country. The Central Military Commission is composed of the following: The Chairman; The Vice-Chairmen; and Members". The term of office of the Central Military Commission is the same as that of the National People's Congress. Two people currently serve as vice chairmen.

The CMC chairman is the supreme commander of the world's largest military forces, People's Liberation Army, People's Armed Police and the Militia. Furthermore, the officeholder is vested with the command authority over the nuclear arsenals.

List of chairmen

Party 
The following have held the position of chair of the Central Military Commission of the Chinese Communist Party:

State 
The following have held the position of chairman of the Central Military Commission of the People's Republic of China:

See also 
 List of leaders of the People's Republic of China
 Supreme Military Command of the People's Republic of China
 Paramount leader

References 

Central Military Commission (China)
Chinese government officials
Commanders in chief